Patur is a town and a municipal council in Akola district in the Indian state of Maharashtra.

Geography

Demographics
 the India census, According to the 2011 census, the total population of Patur was 117,635 in this taluka, of whom 60,765 were male and 56,870 female. In 2019/2020 the estimated population was between 114,106 and 144,691. Literate people are 85,917; 47,978 were male and 37,939 female. Patur has an average literacy rate of 72%, higher than the national average of 59.5%: male literacy is 77%, and female literacy is 66%. In Patur, 15% of the population is under 6 years of age. Patur is a Hindu-majority town with a population percentage of 50% ratio amongst all communities, according to 2011 census.

Politics
Patur Municipal council was established in 1957.
 President of the municipality is Sau. Prabha Bhimrao Kothalkar 
 Vice President Of the municipality is Syed Mujahiduddin 
 Patur Bharip Bahujan Mahasange President Shri :- Raju Bhau Borkar

Education
Major educational institutions include:

Tulsabai Kawal Vidyalaya and Jr. College of Arts/Science, MCVC (Including Technical School and Mother India convent). Established in 1914, completing 100 years in 2014.
 Dr. H. N. Sinha Jr. and Senior College (including B.A./B.Sc.)
 Vasantrao Naik High School and Jr. College
 Savitribai Phule High School and Jr. College
 Gramin Ayurved Mahavidyalaya (BAMS College)
 Government Industrial Training Institute
 Several government and private Marathi, Urdu and English primary schools
 Hemleen Computer Center Class (MS-CIT and Computer Typing Authorized Center) Patur J S Deokar 9421747116
 Easy Maths Classes, Abrar Colony
 Educational Computer Institute (MS-CIT Authorized Center) Patur Deepak Rakhonde Sir 9764748758
Farhan Computer And Skill Development Center, near SB Hostel, Marhaba Colony
Priya darshni indira gandhi Mahavidyalaya Patur Jr. College of Arts.
Laxmibai deshpande Mahavidyalaya
Nagar parishad school No.1 
Nagar parishad school No.2 
Kids Paradise public school
Shah Babu Urdu High School and Jr. College of Arts/Science, Washim Road Patur. Established in 1957, completed 59 years.

Historical places  

 Vitthal Rakumai temple is one of the oldest places in the city. It has a square well made of black stone, each pillar 1m by 1m. Many people visit this place throughout year as it has huge cultural heritage. 
 Khadkeshwar temple, located in the city center on the riverbank. It has huge importance during desshera.
 Renuka mata mandir: located on a hill in the north-west, believed built in the 16th century.

 Patur Caves: Patur Caves near Patur-Balapur Highway, is a historic place built by Buddhist rulers in the 3rd century BCE.
 Shahbabu Drgah on the west side of Patur, has historical importance in Maharashtra. Shahbabu was a 13th-century Muslim saint who came to Patna to preach Islam. Shahbabu was born in Mecca. The dargah was gradually built by many Muslim rulers. The tomb or holy shrine was built by Sultan Muhammad bin Tughluq of Delhi in 1348 AD, then second portion of Khangah and Sher Darwaza were built by Mughal Knight Abdur Raheem Khan-e-Khanaa. With latest development, Buland Darwaza (a copy of Ajmer Sharif Buland Darwaza) built by the late Haji Syed Akbar in 1950.
 Jama Masjid: Grand mosque of Patur, has of prime importance specially on Juma (Friday prayer. Built in 1726 AD by a nawab family of Patur. For the last 300 years it has been under the supervision of the Quazi family. Currently supervised by Quazi Sarfaz Ali.
 Chaman Masjid : No historical records have bee found regarding the building of this mosque (Masjid), it was likely built during the reign of the Tughlaq Emperors. Uptill ran Alhumdulillah under the supervision of Haji Syed Talib and handed over to Badi Masjib Trust, Akola
 Masjid-e-Abrar: Masjid-e-Abrar is situated at Abrar colony near the Balapur road in Patur

References

www.shahbabu.com

Cities and towns in Akola district
Talukas in Maharashtra